John Howard Rone (February 14, 1949 – February 4, 2019) was an American stage actor and director. A lifelong Memphian, Rone was a prominent member of the Memphis theatre community.

Early life
Rone was born in the Memphis suburb of Germantown, Tennessee. There he attended Byars-Hall High School. Rone then earned his BA in theatre from Rhodes College and later his MA in theatre from the University of Memphis.

Career
Rone played multiple roles in the Memphis theatre community, but was best known for his directing. He made his community theatre directorial debut in 1983 with a production of Portrait in Black. Rone worked with multiple troupes and organizations over the course of his long career including Theatre Memphis, Playhouse on the Square, and Germantown Community Theater. Rone was nominated for several Ostrander Awards for his work in various community theatre performances including Sense and Sensibility, Measure for Measure, and I Am a Camera. Rone received the Eugart Yerian Award for Lifetime Service to Memphis Theatre at the 31st Ostrander Awards in 2014.

In addition to his theatre work, Rone returned to work at his alma mater Rhodes College, where he served as director of college events and of the Meeman Center for Life Long Learning.

Stage credits
She Stoops to Conquer as Sir Charles Marlow

Theatre Memphis
Inherit the Wind
Measure for Measure
Hamlet
A Perfect Ganesh, director
A Christmas Carol (2017), director
12 Angry Jurors (2017), director
Sense and Sensibility (2017), director

Playhouse on the Square
A Wonderful Life as Clarence, the Angel
The Mousetrap as Mr. Paravicini

Germantown Community Theatre
Sherlock's Last Case
I Am a Camera
The Foreigner
The Woman in Black
The Importance of Being Earnest, director

New Moon Theatre Company
Lettice and Lovage (2016), director

References

1949 births
2019 deaths
American theatre directors
People from Germantown, Tennessee
Male actors from Memphis, Tennessee
Rhodes College alumni
University of Memphis alumni